Barry Cooper is a British pastor and writer. He lives with his wife and daughters in DeLand, Florida, and serves as Associate Teaching Pastor at Christ Community Church Daytona.

He’s the producer, writer and presenter of the Simply Put podcast, presenter of the Luther: In Real Time podcast, and co-producer/presenter of Cooper & Cary Have Words. From June 2019 until December 2022, he was Supervising Producer at Ligonier Ministries.

Barry is the presenter of the feature-length documentary Luther, writer of the feature-length documentaries Puritan and The Church, and writer of the six-part mini-series Missionary, which is expected to release in 2023. The series explores the lives of William Tyndale, James Hudson Taylor, Amy Carmichael, William Carey, Adoniram Judson, and John Paton.

With Sam Shammas and Rico Tice, he created Christianity Explored, a film series that has so far been used in 100 countries, and translated into 50 languages. He began working on Christianity Explored in 1998, co-founding Christianity Explored Ministries in 2001. Barry is the writer and presenter of the Discipleship Explored film series, co-writer and co-presenter of the Life Explored film series, and co-writer and co-director of the Christianity Explored film series.

Barry has authored and co-authored a number of books including One Life, If You Could Ask God One Question and Can I Really Trust The Bible? He’s also contributed writing to Christianity Today, Desiring God, The Gospel Coalition, 9Marks, and ExploreGod.

Born in Epsom, Surrey, Barry holds an MA in English Language and Literature from St Catherine’s College, Oxford. He wrote, directed and performed in numerous comedy shows at Oxford, and having trained as an actor at the Webber Douglas Academy of Dramatic Art in London, co-ran a theatre company for seven years. He’s performed in such places as Shakespeare’s Globe and the National Theatre.

He holds an MA in Christian Studies from Trinity Evangelical Divinity School in Chicago, interned with Mark Dever at Capitol Hill Baptist Church in Washington DC, and was part of the core team that helped to plant Trinity West church in Shepherd’s Bush, London.

References
https://barrycooper.com/about/

External links
 

Living people
21st-century evangelicals
British evangelicals
British male non-fiction writers
Evangelical writers
Year of birth missing (living people)